Jessica Pupo Álvarez (born 12 September 1990) is a Cuban footballer who plays as a midfielder. She has been a member of the Cuba women's national team.

International career
Pupo capped for Cuba at senior level during the 2012 CONCACAF Women's Olympic Qualifying Tournament (and its qualification) and the 2018 CONCACAF Women's Championship (and its qualification).

References

1990 births
Living people
Cuban women's footballers
Cuba women's international footballers
Women's association football midfielders
21st-century Cuban women